{{DISPLAYTITLE:C11H10}}
The molecular formula C11H10 may refer to:

Methano[10]annulenes
1,5-Methano[10]annulene
1,6-Methano[10]annulene
Methylazulenes
1-Methylazulene
2-Methylazulene
4-Methylazulene
5-Methylazulene
6-Methylazulene
Methylnaphthalenes
1-Methylnaphthalene
2-Methylnaphthalene